Nemesisters is the third and final studio album recorded by Babes in Toyland. It was produced by Tim Mac, and released May 9, 1995 by Reprise Records.

Recording
The album was recorded under engineer and producer Tim Mac at AmRep Studios in Minneapolis, Minnesota. Unlike on the group's previous releases, they opted to record together to capture a "live band" sound; on their previous release, Fontanelle, bassist Maureen Herman had recorded her bass tracks separately from vocalist-guitarist Kat Bjelland and drummer Lori Barbero. The recordings were split into two different sessions. Portions of the album had been written while the band was on tour in Europe. In a March 1995 interview with Barbero, she said the band would likely "be working on the album until Christmas."

Critical response
Tom Sinclair of Entertainment Weekly wrote of the album: "Believe it or not, these Minneapolis ragecore queens have toned down their maximum-stridency shtick a tad, delivering an album that at times actually skirts power pop (check out "Sweet ’69"). The result is still fairly punishing, but there’s a reward for listeners who stick it out to the last cut: a killer version of Sister Sledge’s "We Are Family." Lorraine Ali of Spin wrote: "With Nemesisters, Babes in Toyland's molten core seems to have somewhat solidified; this album ultimately lacks the conviction, depth, and even direction of its predecessors."

Stephen Thomas Erlewine of AllMusic awarded the album two out of five stars, noting: "Most of the raw, slashing guitars of their early records are gone, replaced by a pulsing, plodding grind that never catches fire...the majority of the album is simply dull, recycled riffs and rhythms, and that is hard to forgive."

Track listings

Personnel
Kat Bjellandguitar, vocals
Maureen Hermanbass, vocals , piano 
Lori Barberodrums, vocals

Chart positions

References

Babes in Toyland (band) albums
1995 albums
Reprise Records albums